Sulzbacher is a surname. Notable people with the surname include:

 Louis Sulzbacher (1842–1915), Associate Justice of Supreme Court of Puerto Rico
 Reinhold Sulzbacher (born 1944), Austrian luger
 Willy Sulzbacher (1876–1908), French fencer

See also
 Sulzbacher form of the German ß (eszett)